You Can Dance is a French televised dance competition with a format based on the American show So You Think You Can Dance  It airs on the NT1 television network and is hosted by Benjamin Castaldi.   Premiering in early 2012, the show has aired one season. As with other shows in the international So You Think You Can Dance franchise, its competitors—young semi-professional dancers from a variety of stylistic backgrounds—compete for judge favor and at-home-viewer votes by attempting to master routines from different styles to avoid being cut as the rounds progress.

Season 1

The first season began casting and open auditions in late 2011 and premiered in February 2012.   The judge's panel consisted of permanent members Nico Archambault, Julie Ferrier, and, Kamel Ouali as well as guest judges Matt Pokora, Sofia Essaidi, Fauve Hautot, and Shy'm. After the audition process, the judge's selected a Top 16 dancers to compete in the main "live show" portion of the competition.

Contestants

Male Contestants

Female Contestants

See also
Dance on television

References

2012 French television series debuts
France
French television series based on American television series